United Left–Madrid (IU-Madrid) is the regional branch in the Community of Madrid of United Left since 2016.

References

Political parties in the Community of Madrid
Political parties established in 2016
United Left (Spain)
Federations of United Left (Spain)
2016 establishments in the Community of Madrid